The Thames School of Mines is a nationally significant former school of mining in Thames, New Zealand. It is listed as a Category 1 historic building by Heritage New Zealand.

Purpose 

As stated in the 1901 Syllabus, the Thames School of Mines taught various subjects. The bulk of which directly related to mining. The subjects included: Mathematics, Mining and Applied mechanics, Practical Assaying and Ventilation and Explosives, along with others.

In addition to the teaching of these subjects the school was also used to prepare candidates for the Government certifications of Mine Manager, Battery Superintendent, Engine Driver and Licensed Assayer. The syllabus also states that the exhibition of mineral and geological samples, as well as the assaying and analysis of ore sample as being within the scope of the Thames School of Mines.

The school and its students also conducted experimental research on subjects, such as the refining of the gold extraction process.

Buildings 

It is on the urupa (resting place/burial ground) of Aparangi. It is of particular importance to Ngati Maru Paraone and Te Huiraukura, who gifted the tapu land solely for religious purposes. Ngāti Maru opposed the idea of a primary school on this site, however there was a transition from religious instruction when the school of mines opened in 1886. In addition to the School of Mines, several buildings were built within the complex and the surrounding area such as a church and Sunday School in 1869 and a mineralogical museum that opened in 1901.

Post-operation 
The school closed in 1954. In 1979, the New Zealand Historic Places Trust acquired the complex for historic preservation. It is listed as a Category 1 historic place. It is one of only two known surviving examples of nineteenth century mining school complexes in New Zealand.
Currently, no New Zealand universities offer a mining degree. In 2012, over seven hundred people signed a petition available at the site to save the Kopu Bridge and it was reported that the site had been broken into and damaged.

Notable alumni
Charles Arthur Banks, 17th Lieutenant Governor of British Columbia (1946-1950)
Bob Heffron, 30th Premier of New South Wales (1959-1964)
John Alexander Agnew, Chairman of Consolidated Gold Fields

See also 

 Reefton School of Mines
 Coromandel Gold Rushes

References

External links
 CareersNZ Mining & Quarrying

Heritage New Zealand Category 1 historic places in Waikato
Schools in Waikato
Mining in New Zealand
Thames-Coromandel District
Educational institutions established in 1886
Educational institutions disestablished in 1954
1880s architecture in New Zealand
1886 establishments in New Zealand